Christmas with Slim Whitman is a studio album by Slim Whitman, released in 1980 on Cleveland International Records.

Track listing 
The album was issued in the United States by CBS as a 12-inch long-playing record, catalog number Cleveland International / Epic JE 36847.

Charts

References 

1980 albums
Slim Whitman albums
United Artists Records albums